Craig Anthony Madden (born 25 September 1958) is an English former professional football striker who made more than 400 appearances in the Football League.

Playing career
After playing for Northern Nomads, Madden began his professional career at Bury in 1977. He spent nine years at Gigg Lane, making almost 300 league appearances and scoring 129 goals. He still holds the record for the most goals (35) in a season (1981-82) and remains the clubs' all-time record goalscorer.

A short spell at West Brom followed, before he joined Blackpool, then under the guidance of Sam Ellis, in February 1987. At Bloomfield Road he began to fall prey to niggling injuries, and each time he dropped out of the team it became more difficult for him to break back in. On 11 November 1989, he opened the scoring in Blackpool's home League game against Brentford after just eighteen seconds, which was only seven seconds outside Bill Slater's all-time record for the club. Midway through that disastrous 1989-90 season for Blackpool, Jimmy Mullen allowed him to move to non-league Fleetwood Town, where he found his scoring touch again and continued to enjoy the game.

Madden maintained his connection with Blackpool, becoming the community officer at Bloomfield Road in April 1991. "I am delighted to have landed the job here at Bloomfield Road," he said at the time.  "I am looking forward to getting out and about and meeting people from different groups of the community. My immediate aims are to settle in and carry on with the same activities as before — but hopefully there will be some new ideas too, including two new summer schools for the children's holidays in the summer." He was succeeded in the position by his former Bury and Blackpool teammate Derek Spence.

Management
In 2001, Madden became caretaker manager of Stockport County after the dismissal of Andy Kilner. He is still at the club coaching Stockport's youth team having also helped with the first team in the past.

In June 2010 Madden was appointed assistant manager at newly promoted Fleetwood Town, alongside Micky Mellon.

Following Micky Mellon's departure in December 2012 he became youth team manager.

References

External links
 

1958 births
Living people
Footballers from Manchester
English footballers
English football managers
Bury F.C. players
West Bromwich Albion F.C. players
Blackpool F.C. players
Wrexham A.F.C. players
York City F.C. players
Fleetwood Town F.C. players
Fleetwood Town F.C. non-playing staff
Association football forwards